Abdulaziz Abubakar Chande (Dogo Janja), (born September 15 1994), is a Tanzanian singer-songwriter and rapper. He was born in Dar es Salaam and raised in Ngarenaro ward in the city of Arusha located in the Arusha Region. He is currently based in Dar es Salaam.

Biography 
 
His interest in music began early, but his first official release came in 2016 whilst signed to Tip Top Connection Group, co-founded by Babu Tale, and previously home to other renowned Bongo Flava artists such as Rayvanny. His first release 'My Life' in 2016 was well received, thus establishing his name as an artist.  

In 2017 he married the Bongo movie star Irene Uwoya, Diamond Platnumz's ex girlfriend.

Discography

Albums 
 Tatizo Pesa

Singles 
 2016: My life
 2017: Ngarenaro
 2017: Ukivaaje Unapendeza
 2018 Banana
 2018: Mikogo Sio
 2018: Wayu Wayu
 2018: Since Day One
 2019: Yente
 2020: Asante ft Lady Jaydee

See also 
 Babu Tale
 Irene Uwoya
 Ray Vany
 Alikiba

References

External links

 
 
 
 

21st-century Tanzanian male singers
Tanzanian rappers
Living people
1994 births
People from Arusha Region
 Tanzanian hip hop musicians
 Swahili-language singers
Tanzanian Bongo Flava musicians